Anthony Bella is an Australian rugby league player who played professionally for the South Queensland Crushers. He is of Italian descent.

His daughter, Lauren, plays in the AFLW for the Gold Coast Suns. He is also the brother of Australian international Martin.

Playing career
From a successful rugby league family, Bella signed for the new South Queensland Crushers team in 1995 and was part of their inaugural side on 11 March 1995. He played for the club for three seasons, playing in 25 first grade matches.

Bella also played in the club's final ever game which was against Western Suburbs in Round 22 1997 which South Queensland won 39–18 at the old Lang Park.

References

1973 births
Living people
Australian people of Italian descent
Australian rugby league players
Place of birth missing (living people)
Rugby league locks
Rugby league players from Mackay, Queensland
Rugby league props
Rugby league second-rows
South Queensland Crushers players